Brian Shead (1937–2020) was an Australian racing driver, constructor and administrator, best known for designing, engineering, constructing and driving Cheetah Racing Cars. From May 1970 to February 1980, Shead competed in 293 events, from which he achieved 112 wins, 228 podium places, 85 fastest laps and 30 lap records. His racing career culminated in 1979 when he won a closely contested Australian Formula 2 championship driving one of his own Cheetah Mk6s.

Shead was one of the driving forces behind the establishment of Australian Formula 2 and Formula Holden. He was the chairman of the National Track Safety Committee for the Confederation of Australian Motorsport, and a life member of CAMS.

References

External links
Australian Motor Racing Year 1986/1987 "Cheetah Racing Cars A Continuing Success Story", pages 54–59, Berghouse Publishing Group Pty Ltd, first published 1987, ISSN 0158-4138
oldracingcars.com
Australia Formula 2 Club Inc
CAMS Life Membership citation

1937 births
2020 deaths
Australian Formula 2 drivers
Australian motorsport people
Australian racing drivers